Elazar Stern is an Israeli politician and military general.  He was a major general (res.) in the Israel Defense Forces, serving as Head of the Manpower Directorate, commander of the IDF Officers Training School, and Chief Education Officer, as well as a combat soldier and commander in the Paratroopers Brigade. He has served as a Member of Knesset for eight years, first, as a member of the Hatnuah party, and then in 2015 he joined the Yesh Atid, and since 2021 is serving as the Minister of Intelligence.

Early life and family 
Stern was born in 1956 in Tel Aviv to Sara and Levi, both of whom are Holocaust survivors. He and his wife Dorit have five children and fourteen grandchildren. They live in Mitzpe Hoshaya, a community in the Galilee they founded together with friends some 30 years ago.

Education

Stern holds a bachelor's degree in Land of Israel studies and economics from Bar-Ilan University, an Executive Master of Business Administration (EMBA) from the Kellogg-Recanati International program of Tel Aviv and Northwestern Universities, and a master's degree in Strategic Resource Management from the National Defense University in Washington, D.C.

Parliament and Government Roles

Stern has served as an MK since the Nineteenth Knesset and has been a member of the Constitution, Law and Justice Committee; the Finance Committee; and the Foreign Affairs and Defense Committee. He spearheaded parliamentary efforts to address issues of religion and state and the Jewish and democratic discourse in the Knesset.
Among other bills Stern was involved in passing, he sponsored the Conversion Law (Temporary Order); the Shabbat and Jewish Holidays Law; and the Authorization to Provide Supervision and Regulation over Kashrut Services Law. He chaired the Religion and State Caucus, the Caucus for Ethiopian Immigrant Soldiers, and the Parliamentary Caucus for Holocaust Survivors, through which he fought to expand the resources provided to Holocaust survivors in Israel. He also chaired the Caucus for the Promotion of Israeli Music.

Stern spearheaded the approval of the government resolution regarding the reform of the conversion system in Israel, which eased the conversion process by establishing tribunals headed by city rabbis. He was a prominent member of the Committee for Equal Sharing of the Burden along with the Yesh Atid parliamentary group, in which he fought to extend the military service of soldiers from Hesder Yeshivas.

In the Twentieth Knesset, he and MK Avi Dichter (then the Chairman of the Foreign Affairs and Defense Committee) sponsored the law to freeze funds that the Palestinian Authority received from the Government of Israel and used in conjunction with terrorism.

In June 2021, Stern was appointed Minister of Intelligence in the new government. As Minister he is leading the ministry in building a national intelligence office whose main principles are future planning for crises and major events facing the State of Israel on multiple levels, with an emphasis on trends in the national-civil-international sectors for the Israeli government.

Military service
In 1974, Stern enlisted in the IDF and served with the Paratroopers Brigade, where he held a series
of command positions, including battalion commander. In 1976, he became an infantry officer after completing Officer Candidate School and returned to the Paratroopers Brigade as a platoon leader. Stern took part in various raids against terrorist camps in Lebanon, and served as a Company commander in the 890 "Efe" (Echis) paratroop company. Stern fought in the 1982 Lebanon War, and later on commanded Paratroopers Brigade's training base and the 202 paratroop battalion in South Lebanon.  In 1987, he was released from military service and became a teacher to gifted high school students in Nof HaGalil.
Several years later, Stern re-enlisted in the IDF for career service and continued to fill command
positions in the field units; deputy commander of a territorial brigade on the northern border,
brigade commander, commander of the IDF Officers Training School (Bahad 1), and commander of
an armored division (reserves).

As head of the Human Resources Directorate from 2004-2008, Stern led the IDF's efforts to increase engagement in Jewish and democratic education. He initiated and established the Nativ conversion project, through which more than 12,000 people mainly from the former Soviet Union have converted; he promoted and fostered the absorption of immigrants in the IDF; he strengthened the IDF’s ties with Diaspora Jewry; and he set up the Machtzavim program for the development of Jewish and democratic educational leadership skills among senior IDF officers and members of the various security services. He also helped conceive and led the project to introduce bone marrow transplant match testing to the IDF enlistment procedure, an effort that has saved more than 2,600 lives to date, 58% of whom are Jews from the Diaspora. Stern formulated and oversaw the Edim b’Madim (Witnesses in Uniform) project which sends IDF
soldiers to Poland to witness the concentration camps firsthand, the program is active and tens of thousands of officers have participated including army veterans and bereaved families. He also headed a special committee that reformulated the IDF Code of Ethics and led the writing of the “Ya’ud VeYachud” covenant, which strengthened Jewish and Zionist values and the relationship between the IDF and the Israeli society, and with diaspora Jewry.

Controversy
Stern's actions as a senior officer were subjected to public controversy in 2021, at which time he was serving as a minister, over having suppressed sexual harassment complaints. In an October 2021 interview, Stern claimed that as head of the Manpower Directorate he ignored anonymous sexual harassment complaints, saying "people who have something to say about others should speak openly. We mustn’t be complicit in a culture of anonymous complaints. During my time as head of the Manpower Directorate, I shredded many anonymous complaints." The remarks caused public controversy and were condemned by women's groups. Stern apologized and subsequently claimed that while he had shredded anonymous complaints, he had never done so with complaints of sexual assault, and that he was simply speaking out against a "culture of anonymous complaints." 

Two anonymous former female soldiers subsequently accused him of covering up claims of harassment and assault. One of them claimed that as head of the officer's school, he had threatened her against repeating allegations she had made against a non-commissioned officer and that he had threatened to make her time in the army "dark and bitter" if she did. Stern denied having said that and claimed that the fact that he had spoken to both her and the alleged perpetrator was proof that he had dealt with the allegation, but conceded that her treatment "may not have been good." Another woman who had served as an officer in charge of dealing with sexual harassment at the IDF officer's school during the time when Stern commanded it said that Stern had ignored complaints by herself and others, and that the base had "an atmosphere of harassment." She claimed that when she complained to Stern about a male officer who had tried to kiss her against her will, he dismissed it as "nonsense" and said that he would look into it, but that she knew he never would and he avoided the topic whenever she brought it up. Stern's office subsequently claimed that the case was handled stringently by him and the offending officer was relocated and his service was shortened.

Due to the public controversy this generated, Stern withdrew his candidacy for head of the Jewish Agency.

Other activities
In 2009, Elazar was released from the IDF and published a book that was later translated into English as Struggling over Israel’s Soul: An IDF General Speaks of His Controversial Moral Decisions. From 2010 until his entry into the Knesset in 2012, Stern served as the volunteer chairman of the Foundation for the Benefit of Holocaust Victims in Israel, chaired the Ethiopian National Project from 2012, and was a member of the board of directors of the Habima Theatre.

References

External links
Elazar Stern IDF

1956 births
Living people
People from Tel Aviv
Israeli Jews
Tel Aviv University alumni
Bar-Ilan University alumni
Northwestern University alumni
Israeli generals
Hatnua politicians
Yesh Atid politicians
Members of the 19th Knesset (2013–2015)
Members of the 20th Knesset (2015–2019)
Members of the 21st Knesset (2019)
Members of the 22nd Knesset (2019–2020)
Members of the 23rd Knesset (2020–2021)
Members of the 24th Knesset (2021–2022)
Members of the 25th Knesset (2022–)
Government ministers of Israel
Jewish Israeli politicians
Ministers of Intelligence of Israel